Sperryville Historic District is a national historic district located at Sperryville, Rappahannock County, Virginia, USA. It encompasses 63 contributing buildings in the village of Sperryville.  The buildings are predominantly wood-frame, one-and two-story residences, some of which have been converted to commercial establishments. They include a collection of former factory workers' housing built to serve the workers of the Smoot tannery from 1867 to the early 20th century. A number of the buildings were constructed after 1850 with ornamentation and board-and-batten siding that is suggestive of the mid-century Romantic Revivals. Notable buildings include the George William Cooper House, the Dr. Amiss House, the Hopkins Ordinary, and the Totten's Mill House.

It was added to the National Register of Historic Places in 1983.

References

External links
 Sperryville Historic District Topographic Map 

Historic districts in Rappahannock County, Virginia
Victorian architecture in Virginia
National Register of Historic Places in Rappahannock County, Virginia
Historic districts on the National Register of Historic Places in Virginia